David Schnaufer (September 28, 1952 – August 23, 2006) was an American folk musician. He is widely credited with restoring the popularity of the Appalachian dulcimer.

Schnaufer was born in Hearne, Texas, and grew up in La Marque, Texas. Schnaufer was an award-winning dulcimer player and session musician. He moved to Nashville, Tennessee, during the 1980s, and in 1995, accepted a position at Vanderbilt University's Blair School of Music, where he taught dulcimer as an associate adjunct professor. He established himself as one of the country's premier dulcimer players. He played the dulcimer on recordings with The Judds, Emmylou Harris, Johnny Cash, and Chet Atkins, among others. One of his earliest recordings was on Mark O'Connor's 1988 album Elysian Forest. O'Connor had initially sought out Schnaufer after hearing him play an instrumental version of the Joni Mitchell song "Both Sides Now". Schnaufer also released several solo albums of dulcimer music.
He had many students, one of whom was the singer Cyndi Lauper.

Schnaufer died at Alive Hospice in Nashville after a battle with lung cancer.

Discography
Elysian Forest (Mark O'Connor, 1988)
Dulcimer Player Deluxe (SFL, 1989)
Dulcimer sessions (SFL, 1992)
The Cactus Brothers (Liberty, 1993)
Tennessee music box (Rivertime Records, 1996)
Delcimore (The Orchard, 2000)
Uncle Dulcimer (Delcimore Recordings, 2001)
Appalachian Mandolin and Dulcimer:Music (Soundart Recordings, 2006), recorded with Butch Baldassari

Notes

External links
  Obituary.
 https://web.archive.org/web/20080105062502/http://www.musicallmusic.com/davidschnaufer/

1953 births
2006 deaths
Schaufer, David
Deaths from lung cancer
People from Nashville, Tennessee
People from Hearne, Texas
Appalachian dulcimer players
Deaths from cancer in Tennessee
People from La Marque, Texas
Musicians from Texas
Musicians from Tennessee
20th-century American musicians